Dolores Jiménez y Muro (June 7, 1848 – October 15, 1925) was a Mexican schoolteacher and revolutionary.  A native of Aguascalientes, Aguascalientes, Mexico, she rose to prominence during the Mexican Revolution as a Socialist activist and reformer and as a supporter and associate of General Emiliano Zapata.

Biography
Dolores Jiménez y Muro was born June 7, 1848, in Aguascalientes, Mexico, but while young her family moved San Luis Potosí. She grew up in the upper middle class of San Luis Potosí, where her father was a senior government official. The family had many liberal friends and from her childhood Jiménez was exposed to foreign and liberal ideas. She had no formal schooling, studying at home, but was encouraged to pursue her talent for poetry. In 1874, she was invited by the state government to read her poems at an official celebration of the September independence festivals. These poems were later collected into a book and published as Un rayo de luz (A Ray of Light). In 1883 Jiménez lost both of her parents and she began teaching school. She became aware of how easily one could fall into poverty or become exploited.

Pre-Revolutionary radicalism
Dolores Jiménez published in La Esmeralda and La Sombra de Zaragoza and by 1902 had become the director of La Potosina Magazine. She continued to teach in the rural school system until 1904, when she moved to Mexico City. She published articles against the regime of Porfirio Díaz and was arrested. In prison, she met Elisa Acuña Rossetti, Juana Belén Gutiérrez de Mendoza, and Inés Malváez. From prison, the woman began publishing a radical journal, Fiat Lux. In 1905, she joined the staff of the La Mujer Mexicana (Mexican Women) for whom she worked until 1908. She also published articles in Diario del Hogar (Newspaper of the Home).

In 1907, Acuña, Belén and Jiménez y Muro founded the "Daughters of Anahuac", a group of about three hundred libertarian women, who demanded improved working conditions for women and advocated labor strikes. In 1908, Jiménez founded, with Acuña, Belén, and Jose Edilberto Pinelo, a worker's organization in Mexico City called "Mexican Socialism." They continued to publish the newspaper Fiat Lux, as the voice of an organization called the Mutual Society for Women. In 1910, Jiménez and others founded the Club Femenil Antirreeleccionista Hijas de Cuauhtémoc (Anti-Reelectionist Women's Club: Daughters of Cuauhtémoc). The club, including members Mercedes Arvides and Julia Nava de Ruisánchez staged a demonstration in Mexico City on 11 September 1910 protesting election fraud. These activities and a failed attempt at rebellion by supporters of Arriaga resulted in the arrest of Jiménez, Acuña, Belén, and María Dolores Malváes and their imprisonment at San Juan de Ulúa fortress in the Gulf of Mexico.

Revolutionary radicalism
In prison in 1911, Dolores Jiménez continued to be politically active in jail and founded Regeneración y Concordia. Through this she sought to further the changes that she desired to see in Mexico. She envisioned a country where there were significant improvements to the economy and land reforms. She also wanted changes to improve the living conditions of women and indigenous people. Regeneración y Concordia had feminist aims which her partners, Acuña, Belén and  Sara Estela Ramírez joined her work.

In March, 1911, Francisco I. Madero called for demonstrations in Guerrero, Michoacan, Tlaxcala, Puebla and Campeche, and Jiménez organized the protests. She was a notable contributor to the Complot de Tacubaya, which sought to depose President Porfirio Díaz in favor of Francisco I. Madero. She is credited with writing "The Political and Social Plan", published on March 18, 1911, which outlined the ideas and aims of the conspirators. The "Plan" advocated a continuation of the demands the Mexican Liberal Party had made in 1906, including fair wages, affordable housing, improved working conditions, and curbs on foreign investment. It also promoted the decentralization of the country's education system, on the premise that a school's needs are best met when it is locally funded and controlled. Unlike earlier revolutionary theorists, however, Jiménez insisted that wage should be increased for women as well as for men. She also insisted that foreign firms operating in Mexico should be required to have at least half of their workforce made up of Mexicans.

After the plan was read in Mexico City on 31 October 1911, interim president Francisco León de la Barra had Jiménez arrested. In spite of her age, (she was 61 and most of her compatriot revolutionaries were in their 20s), she was refused release until she staged a hunger strike. She realized that Madero was not a supporter of the radical reforms she supported and switched her loyalty to Emiliano Zapata. In 1913, she joined the Zapatista forces and developed the prologue to the Plan de Ayala. She directed the newspaper La voz de Juárez from which denounced the coup led by Victoriano Huerta to overthrow Madero. Zapata appointed her to a position of brigadier general but that was insufficient to prevent an eleven-month imprisonment ordered in 1914 by Huerta. She was released from prison and rejoined Zapata until his assassination in 1919.

Post-revolution
Between 1921 and 1924, Jiménez worked in the Secretary of Education's Cultural Missions program.

She died on October 15, 1925, in Mexico City, at the age of 75.

Selected works
Un rayo de luz
Al inmortal Hidalgo
En el Aniversario Published in The Shadow of Zaragoza. Official Gazette of the State, September 15, 1874 p. 3 Volume. No. VIII, p. 787
Crepúscuo Published in: Joaquín Antonio Peñalosa, San Luis Potosí Literature XIX century, San Luis Potosí, SLP, Eds. UASLP 1991, pp. 272–273

References

People of the Mexican Revolution
Mexican rebels
People from Aguascalientes City
Mexican revolutionaries
Mexican feminist writers
1848 births
1925 deaths
Porfiriato
Mexican socialists
Women in war